Seiya Da Costa Lay (born 30 September 2001) is an Indonesian professional footballer who plays as a defensive midfielder for Liga 1 club Arema.

Club career

Arema 
He was signed for Arema to play in Liga 1 in the 2021 season. Seiya made his debut on 11 December 2022 as a substitute in a match against Persis Solo at the Jatidiri Stadium, Semarang.

Career statistics

Club 

Notes

References

External links 
 Seiya Da Costa Lay at Soccerway
 Seiya Da Costa Lay at Liga Indonesia

2001 births
Living people
Indo people
People from Hiroshima
Indonesian people of Japanese descent
Indonesian people of Portuguese descent
Indonesian people of Chinese descent
Indonesian sportspeople of Chinese descent
Sportspeople from Hiroshima
Liga 1 (Indonesia) players
Indonesian footballers
Arema F.C. players
Association football midfielders